Disincarnate is the second studio album by the death metal band Loudblast, released in 1991.

Track listing
All music written by Loudblast. All lyrics as noted.
 "Steering For Paradise" 6:03 (François Jamin, Stéphane Buriez)
 "After Thy Thought" 4:31 (Nicolas Leclercq, Buriez)
 "Dusk To Dawn" 3:43 (Buriez)
 "Outlet For Conscience" 4:56 (Buriez)
 "Disquieting Beliefs 4:08 (Jamin, Buriez)
 "The Horror Within" 3:36 (Buriez)
 "Arrive Into Death Soon" 5:25 (Thierry Pinck, Buriez)
 "Wrapped In Roses" 3:24 (Buriez)
 "Shaped Images Of Disincarnate Spirits" 4:36 (Buriez)

Personnel

Loudblast
Stéphane Buriez: Vocals, Rhythm and Lead Guitar
Nicolas Leclercq: Rhythm and Lead Guitar
François Jamin: Bass
Thierry Pinck: Drums

Additional Personnel
Kam Lee (Death and Massacre) : Vocals on "The Horror Within"
Kent Smith (of Soundsmith Productions): Keyboards and Special Effects

Production
Arranged by Loudblast
Produced and Mixed by Scott Burns
Recorded by Scott Burns with assistance by Fletcher McLean
Mastered by Mike Fuller

References

Loudblast albums
1991 albums
Albums produced by Scott Burns (record producer)
Listenable Records albums